Sandersons Hope is a  mountain in Avannaata municipality in northwestern Greenland, located in the western part of Qaarsorsuaq Island in the Upernavik Archipelago. It was named by John Davis in 1587.

Geography 
Sandersons Hope is covered by snow for most of the year, although it is not glaciated.

Gallery

References 

Mountains of the Upernavik Archipelago